Santos Carlos Labaca Martínez (born November 1, 1949, in Pasajes, Gipuzkoa) is a former Spanish handball player who competed in the 1972 Summer Olympics.

In 1972, he was part of the Spanish team which finished fifteenth in the Olympic tournament. He played four matches and scored five goals.

References

1949 births
Living people
Spanish male handball players
Olympic handball players of Spain
Handball players at the 1972 Summer Olympics
People from Pasaia
Sportspeople from Gipuzkoa
Handball players from the Basque Country (autonomous community)